A Very Christmas Story (original Polish: Świąteczna Przygoda) is a 2000 Polish comedy film written and directed by Dariusz Zawiślak.

Plot
Corporate accountant Mike Young (Paul Burczyk) has a briefcase full of stolen money. Angelika (Kasia Olarz) seeks money to save her orphanage. The Angel of Death (Jan Englert) has been begging God (Gustaw Holoubek) for a vacation day. With so many souls to be gathered, a substitute is found, but when on vacation Death crosses paths with a Guardian Angel (Teresa Dzielska). Meanwhile, Angelica is looking for Santa Claus to fulfill her Christmas wish for money.  During her search she crosses paths with an accountant named Claus (Bartosz Opania) who has stolen a huge amount of money and who is himself being pursued by a group of bumbling hoodlums.

Cast

 Paul Burczyk as Young
 Kasia Olarz as Angelica
 Bartosz Opania as Claus
 Jan Englert as Death
 Jerzy Łapiński as Poodle
 Teresa Dzielska as Jo 
 Slawomir Pacek as Dachshound
 Gustaw Holoubek as God
 Jacek Jarzyna as Mr. Walizeczka
 Stefan Burczyk as Q
 Józef Fryzlewicz as Boss
 Dorota Naruszewicz
 Wojciech Mann
 Krzysztof Materna
 Aleksandra Nieśpielak
 Rafal Okyne

Soundtrack

 Kto Wie, performed by De Su
 Kiedy Rozsypia Sie Pomarancze, performed by Daria Druzgala
 Dwie Strony Medalu, performed by Wojciech Dmochowski
 Szklane Kulki, performed by Zuzanna Madejska
 Intro, composed by Rafal Wnuk
 Niebo, composed by Rafal Wnuk
 Dziewczynka 
 Konfrontacja, composed by Rafal Wnuk
 Jamnik i Pudel 
 Pomarancze 
 Chinczyk 
 Dwie Strony Medalu II, performed by Wojciech Dmochowski
 Szklane Kulki II, performed by Zuzanna Madejska
 Karaiby  
 Kto Wie (Wersja Instrumentalna)
 De Su - "Kto Wie"

Locations
The film was shot on locations in New York City, Warsaw, and Amsterdam.

Recognition
 2001, nomination for Golden Lion for 'Best Picture' at Gdynia Film Festival.

References

External links
 
 Original Świąteczna Przygoda poster
 Main soundtrack
 A Very Christmas Story at the Internet Movie Database

2000 films
2000 comedy films
2000s English-language films
2000s Polish-language films
Polish comedy films
2000 multilingual films
Polish multilingual films